Anomalous X-ray pulsars (AXPs) are an observational manifestation of magnetars—young, isolated, highly magnetized neutron stars. These energetic X-ray pulsars are characterized by slow rotation periods of ~2–12 seconds and large magnetic fields of ~1013–1015 gauss (1 to 100 gigateslas). , there were 12 confirmed and 2 candidate AXPs known. The identification of AXPs with magnetars was motivated by their similarity to soft gamma repeaters.

References

Sources

External links 
Meissner Effect in Quark Stars (University of Calgary)